The 1840 United States presidential election in Massachusetts took place between October 30 and December 2, 1840, as part of the 1840 United States presidential election. Voters chose 14 representatives, or electors to the Electoral College, who voted for President and Vice President.

Massachusetts voted for the Whig candidate, William Henry Harrison, over Democratic candidate Martin Van Buren. Harrison won Massachusetts by a margin of 16.16%.

Results

See also
 United States presidential elections in Massachusetts

References

Massachusetts
1840
1840 Massachusetts elections